Brookhaven Calabro Airport  is a public airport located one mile (1.6 km) north of the central business district of Shirley, in Suffolk County, New York, United States. This airport is publicly owned by the Town of Brookhaven.

Although most U.S. airports use the same three-letter location identifier for the FAA and IATA, Brookhaven Airport is assigned HWV by the FAA and WSH by the IATA. The airport's ICAO identifier is KHWV.

History
Brookhaven Airport was constructed during World War II to provide logistical support for U.S. Army Air Corps operations. Known as Mastic Flight Strip, the title of the airport was transferred to New York State after the war. In 1961 the airport was acquired by the Town of Brookhaven. It was later renamed in honor of Dr. Frank Calabro, an important figure in the airport's development.

Facilities and aircraft
Brookhaven Airport covers an area of 795 acres (3.2 km²) which contains two runways:

 Runway 6/24: 4,200 x 100 ft. (1,280 x 30 m), surface: asphalt
 Runway 15/33: 4,224 x 150 ft. (1,287 x 46 m), surface: asphalt/concrete

For 12-month period ending March  25, 2005, the airport had 135,100 aircraft operations, an average of 370 per day: 99% general aviation (135,000) and <1% military (100). There are 217 aircraft based at this airport: 92% single engine (200), 5% multi engine (10) and 3% gliders (5).

Defunct Dowling College used to operate at Brookhaven Airport. Its School of Aviation offered bachelor's degrees in Aerospace Systems Technology and Aviation Management, and it participated in the FAA Air Traffic Control Collegiate Training Initiative (AT-CTI).

References

 Shaw, Frederick J. (2004), Locating Air Force Base Sites History's Legacy, Air Force History and Museums Program, United States Air Force, Washington DC, 2004.

External links
 

Flight Strips of the United States Army Air Forces
Airfields of the United States Army Air Forces in New York (state)
Brookhaven, New York
Airports in Suffolk County, New York